WWF Jakked and WWF Metal are American professional wrestling television programs that were produced by the World Wrestling Federation (WWF, now known as WWE). Both programs aired syndicated weekly from August 28, 1999 until May 19, 2002 and replaced WWF Shotgun Saturday Night. Originally produced under the World Wrestling Federation (WWF) banner, they were replaced by the similarly formatted WWE Bottom Line and WWE Afterburn in syndication.

History
Jakked aired on Saturday nights while Metal aired in the afternoon. Both shows featured matches from the week's events, including exclusive undercard matches taped before Raw is War. As a result of the WWE Brand Extension, from April 2002 until the discontinuation of Jakked and Metal in May of that year (by which the shows were now named WWE Jakked and WWE Metal per the name change that month), both shows began to feature matches from the SmackDown brand; as such, it was taped before SmackDown tapings. In late May, WWE Velocity premiered and began to serve a similar purpose for the SmackDown brand, while Heat (originally taped before SmackDown!) remained part of the Raw brand.

Metal aired in the United Kingdom on Sky1 until also being replaced by WWE After Burn in May 2002.

Jakked and Metal were hosted by many commentators and interviewers. Frequent commentators and hosts included Michael Cole, Kevin Kelly, Tom Prichard, Jonathan Coachman, Chris Leary, Marc Lloyd, Terry Taylor and Al Snow.

References

External links

Jakked Metal
1999 American television series debuts
2002 American television series endings
First-run syndicated television programs in the United States
Jakked Metal